Rendezvous at Bray is a 1971 French-Belgian drama film directed by André Delvaux and starring Anna Karina. It was entered into the 21st Berlin International Film Festival. Much of the film may be imagined by the characters and much is unexplained, leaving viewers to come up with their own interpretations.

Plot
Jacques, a composer serving as a fighter pilot during the First World War, asks his friend Julien, a Luxembourger working as a music journalist in Paris, to meet him at Bray behind the front lines. His family's country house is there, looked after by a solitary housekeeper. Jacques has not arrived when Julien turns up and is let in by the beautiful but largely silent woman. While she prepares him dinner, he reflects on the ups and downs of his life in Paris before the war with the charming rich Jacques and his vivacious girl friend Odile. After showing him to a bedroom, the servant spends the night with him. In the morning, he rushes off to the railway station but does not board the Paris train. Something, we do not know what, impels him to stay.

Cast
 Anna Karina as Elle (la servante)
 Mathieu Carrière as Julien Eschenbach
 Roger Van Hool as Jacques Neuil
 Bulle Ogier as Odile
 Boby Lapointe as L'Aubergiste
 Pierre Vernier as Monsieur Hausmann
 Luce Garcia-Ville as Mme Nueil
 Nella Bielski as Un Visage (la femme du train)
 Pierre Lampe as Le Soldat
 Jean Aron as Joseph, le projectionniste
 Léonce Corne as Le Garde-Vue
 Martine Sarcey as Mme Hausmann
 Jean Bouise as Le rédacteur en chef

References

External links

1971 films
1970s French-language films
1970s German-language films
1971 drama films
Louis Delluc Prize winners
Films directed by André Delvaux
Films scored by Frédéric Devreese
1971 multilingual films
French drama films
Belgian drama films
French multilingual films
Belgian multilingual films
1970s French films